Mels is a given name. It was popular in the Soviet Union as an acronym of famous and infamous Soviet thinkers and statesmen:
Мэлс (Маркс, Энгельс, Ленин и Сталин),
Mels (Marx, Engels, Lenin and Stalin).

Persons with the given name 
 Mels Hamzajevitch Yeleussizov (born 1950), Kazakh public figure and ecologist. He was a candidate for President of Kazakhstan in the 2005 and 2011 elections.
 Mels Fedorovich(ru) (born 1949, Pskent, Tashkent region), was a Soviet sambo wrestler, Honored Coach of Uzbekistan (1982), and in 2022, he is the Vice President of the Judo Federation of Uzbekistan.
 Mels Zhamyanovich Sambuev(ru) (1940–1981), was a Buryat poet in the Soviet Union.

Fictional characters in pop culture 
 Mels is the main character in the Russian film Stilyagi (2008).

Given names